Matijevic or Matijević may refer to:
Matijevic (surname)
 Matijevic Hill, on the planet Mars
Jake Matijevic (rock), on the planet Mars
 Industrija mesa Matijević, Serbian agribusiness company

See also
 Matijevići (disambiguation)